L.A. L.A. is a compilation album of the best of the music recorded by Stiv Bators at the Bomp! Records studios (other than his 1980 LP, Disconnected) before and after his involvement with the Lords of the New Church when he was attempting to reinvent himself as a pop singer. The title track about Los Angeles was a 10" single.

Track listing

 "The Last Year" (Stiv Bators/Frank Secich) – Rel. May 1979, single version
 "It's Cold Outside" (Danny Klawon) – Rel. May 1979, single version
 "Circumstantial Evidence" (Stiv Bators/Frank Secich) – Rel. January 1980, single version
 "Not that Way Anymore" (Stiv Bators/Frank Secich) – Rel. January 1980, single version
 "I'll Be Alright" (Stiv Bators/Frank Secich) – Rec. 1980, unreleased demo
 "I Stand Accused" (W. Levine) – Rec. 1979, unreleased demo
 "L.A. L.A." ("Louie Louie") (Richard Berry/Stiv Bators) – Rec. Jan. 1980, unreleased jam session
 "Blues" (Kim Fowley/Stiv Bators) – Rec. January 1980, unreleased jam session
 "Factory Boy" (Kim Fowley/Stiv Bators) – Rec. January 1980, unreleased jam session
 "The Story in Your Eyes" (Justin Hayward) – Rel. Fall of 1986
 "Have Love Will Travel" (Richard Berry) – Rel. Fall of 1986
 "I'm No More" (Hurriganes) – Rel. 1987, unreleased demo
 "Gudbuy T' Jane" (Holder/Lea) – Rel. 1987, unreleased demo
 "Circumstantial Evidence" (Stiv Bators/Frank Secich), alternate version
 "I'll Be Alright" (Stiv Bators/Frank Secich), alternate version
 "Not that Way Anymore" (Stiv Bators/Frank Secich), alternate version
 "It's Cold Outside" (Danny Klawon), alternate version
 "The Last Year" (Stiv Bators/Frank Secich), alternate version

References

Punk rock compilation albums
1994 compilation albums
Stiv Bators albums